Contai is a coastal and subdivisional city and a municipality in Purba Medinipur district, West Bengal, India. It is the headquarters of the Contai subdivision. It is the second most populated city of the district.According to the geologists, the present geographical dimension of Contai came into existence with the great natural disaster of the third century AD (flood), which created Chilka lake out of the Chilka Bay. Kanthi, that is Contai, means "sand-bound reefs" or sand walls. The name Contai may thus be an English expression of the local jargon meaning "sand heaps".

Etymology
In the 5th century, during the visit of Fa-Hien, Contai was uninhabited and had no name for the outside world. In Valentine's travelogue, a harbour, Petua by name, was mentioned. This harbour was on the bank of the river Rasulpur, a short distance from the Rasulpur estuary. Later the harbour was shifted to the present site of the Contai Town. However, it is said, the name of the abandoned port was retained for its new location, In foreigners tongue, Petua is said to have changed first to Cauntee and finally to Contai, whereas in local tongue it has changed to Kanthi (কাঁথি).

But linguists raise serious doubts about such change of pronunciation. They offer other suggestions. Yogesh Chandra Sarkar thinks that the name Kanthi owes its origin to outstretched sand-dune, about 27 miles from Rasulpur estuary to Peeplipattan, that from the sea looked like a long wall or Kanth (কাঁথি) as it is called by local people.
Some suggest that the name may originate from the custom of local people to build long walls or Kanths around their habitation in order to keep off wild beasts like buffaloes, tigers and rhinoceroses that were found in abundance then and these Kanths gave the place its name.

Yet, some people, conversant with the local history, give another explanation. They say on the sand dunes lived Saints and Fakirs or witch doctors to whom afflicted people often came for cure and who asked them affectionately in somewhat Hindi, "Kanha thee?" meaning to say, "where are you from?" Gradually the cure-seeking people coming from distant places came to identify this unnamed place by those two words "Kanha thee", and in course of time the words merged into one to give the virgin or Ahalya land a name.

History 
In 1243, Contai was the site of the Battle of Katasin, in which Narasingha Deva I of the Eastern Ganga dynasty defeated Tughral Tughan Khan, the Bengal governor of the Mamluk dynasty of Delhi. Contai was later a part of the Hijli Kingdom, a tributary state of Orissa ruled by the Hindu king Gopinath Pattanayak.
In 1852 the East India Company of British India announced Contai as a Sub-Division consisting of six police stations - Contai, Khejuri, Ramnagar, Bhagwanpur, Egra and Patashpur. But the Government continued working from Negua. The Sub-Division that covered  was the second largest in Bengal .
In 1863 when Nimak Mahal (the salt factory and business center) at Contai, in the teeth of a serious crisis, ceased functioning, the Sub-Divisional office was shifted from Negua to the abandoned Nimak Mahal building.

Bankim Chandra Chottopadhyay, the precursor of Bengali novel, worked as the Deputy Magistrate of Contai, though for a short period, from January 1860 to November of the year. In 2002, Medinipur District was divided into two parts – Purba Medinipur and Paschim Medinipur for the sake of administrative efficiency and expediency. Purba Medinipur consists of four Sub-Divisions – Tamluk, Contai, Egra and Haldia. Contai Sub-Division now consists of eight blocks of Ramnagar, Digha, Kanthi (Contai), Khejuri and Bhupatinagar.

For details history of Contai, see History of Contai

Geography

Location
Contai is about 160 km from Kolkata and 31 km from the beach town Digha.

Climate
Contai receives heavy rains during monsoon. Winters are not that severe. Summers are average and cooler than that of northern India.

Urbanisation
93.55% of the population of Contai subdivision live in the rural areas. Only 6.45% of the population live in the urban areas and it is considerably behind Haldia subdivision in urbanization, where 20.81% of the population live in urban areas.

Demographics
As per 2011 Census of India, Contai had a total population of 92,226 of which 49,031 (53%) were males and 43,195 (47%) were females. Population below 6 years was 8,440. The total number of literates in Contai was 78,500 (93.69% of the population over 6 years).

 India census, Contai had a population of 77,497. Males constitute 52% of the population and females 48%. Contai has an average literacy rate of 82%, higher than the national average of 59.5%: male literacy is 85% and, female literacy is 78%. In Contai, 10% of the population is under 6 years of age.

Police stations
Located at the heart of the town, Contai police station has jurisdiction over Contai I and Deshapran CD Blocks. It covers an area of 370.80 km2 with a population of  382,216. Contai Women police station was opened on 18 March 2012. It has jurisdiction over Contai subdivision.

Economy 
Contai is famous for its tourism, cashew crop, fishing and processing industries. Fishing is the predominant high earning business apart from Cashew processing in Contai. Many people are associated with Prawn cultivation. Processing of dry fish is also practised in certain regions. The cultivation fields are generally outside the main town. Paddy is the main food crop cultivated in Contai. Cashew processing industry is mainly practised in the areas in and around Majna, a village 5 km off Contai town. It is the second highest paddy producing district in West Bengal. The land is highly fertile and therefore, agriculture is also the major driving force that sustains the middle-class economy of this region. However, sometimes agriculture is affected by frequent floods due to torrential monsoon rains and cyclones formed from depressions in the Bay of Bengal. A major portion of the towns dwellers are associated with business. Businessmen still form the major number of workforce in the main town. The main bazaar of Contai town is Contai Super Market. Apart from that there are New Market, Raja Bazaar, and unorganized market distributed throughout. Popular tourist attractions like Digha, Mandarmani, Junput, Tajpur, Sankarpur are near the area of Contai Subdivision. Petuaghat, the biggest fishing port of Asia is located near Contai.

Transportation

Contai is well connected by roads/highways with other nearby cities and towns and several important junctions like, Digha, Dantan, Jhargram, Kharagpur, Midnapore, Tamluk, Haldia, Howrah and Kolkata. Kanthi railway station is connected by a rail link to Howrah/Kolkata which is again extended to Digha. Kandari Express, Tamralipta Express and Howrah–Digha Super AC Express connects Kolkata and Contai. Local trains are available too. Contai is directly connected by rail to Asansol, Malda Town and Siliguri of West Bengal, Puri of Odisha and Vishakapatnam of Andhra Pradesh. The rail line is believed to have given a rise to the local economy. For local transportation, bus, mini-bus, taxi and much eco-friendly options like toto, autos and cycle rickshaws are available.

The opening of Central Central Bus Terminus has eased the traffic congestion within the town to a great deal. The NH-116B from Nandakumar to Digha which passes through Contai was scheduled to get converted to dual road within 2020 thus enabling swifter trade, commerce and tourism.

Education
There are a number of well-known schools and colleges in Contai. For higher education, besides the Prabhat Kumar College, Contai  under the Vidyasagar University, there is an Ayurvedic medical college, named Raghunath Ayurved Mahavidyalaya and Hospital; a Government Polytechnic Engineering College named Contai Polytechnic; a private management college, named Contai College of Learning and Management Science; three B.Ed colleges; private ITI colleges and many more. There are plans to upgrade the Contai sub-divisional hospital into a medical college. Contai is one of the most educated cities of West Bengal. The literacy rate of Contai town is as high as 90%. Being in the most educated district (Purba Medinipur) of West Bengal, Contai boasts a lot of highly talented students and teachers along with higher secondary schools. There is one CBSE board school (up to 12th standard) and one ICSE board school. There are more than 20 schools in Contai.

List of schools in Contai

 Contai Public School
 Contai Kshetra Mohan Bidhyabhaban (H.S.)
 Safiabad Sital Prasad Vidyamandir (H.S)
 Contai High School (H.S.)
 Contai Model Institution (H.S.)
 Contai Hindu Girls' School (H.S.)
 Contai Chandramani Brahmo Girls' School
 Contai Town Rakhal Chandra Vidyapith
 Kishorenagar Sachindra Siksha Sadan
 Kalikapur High School
 Contai Rahamania High Madrasha H/S
 Contai Muslim Girls' School
 Contai Sawkatia English Medium High Madrasha School
 Mount Litera Zee School, Contai
 Contai St. Paul's School
 North Point Day School

Health

There are many hospitals in the Contai town; one is the Contai Subdivisional Hospital. People of this subdivision depend mainly on this hospital. There are also two primary health clinics newly inaugurated at Old Outdoor Hospital and Contai Central Bus Terminus. There are also many private nursing homes. Health of common people is generally good. Rotary Polyclinic is a well-known private NGO-clinic in the locality.

Culture

Among many festivals in Contai, "Gandhi Mela" is the most popular. It is a type of fair. It is held during January/February every year and it continues for 10 or 15 days. Many people from Contai and neighbouring subdivisions take part in "Gandhi Mela" not only for amusement but also for agricultural and industrial exhibitions. There are also some cultural institutions like Contai Bramho Samaj, Contai Harisabha, Contai Club etc. The regular Bengali festivals like Durga Puja, Saraswati Puja and Kali Puja are well attended. Other common pujas in the worship of Sitala, Jagaddhatri, Holi, Janmastami, Bheema Puja, Viswakarma also takes place. Film productions has newly seen a growth in recent years in this town. Several cultural programmes are frequently organised at the Town Hall. There is also an annual book fair held in the town. Baishakhi mela is another popular fair organised recently by the Contai Nandanik Club. There are frequent T20 tournaments held in winter in the various stadiums of Contai. Muharram Mela and Tajiya demonstration are some popular festivals in Contai observed by Muslims of the region and collectively shared and enjoyed by Hindus and other communities of the region as well. There is a competition held in Darua Karabala maidan for the best decorated Tajiya.

Arts and crafts

Notable people
 Birendranath Sasmal, nationalist Barrister
 Sudhir Chandra Das, politician
 Suvendu Adhikari, former member of Lok Sabha, former Minister of Govt. of West Bengal
 Sisir Adhikari, member of the Lok Sabha, former Minister of State of Govt. of India
 Tuhina Das, Bengali actress

Tourist spots

 Kapalkundala Temple
 Digha beach
 Hijli Mosque
 Dariapur Light House
 Daksin Paikbar
 Rajbari
 Sankarpur beach
 Mandarmani beach
 Tajpur
 Virgin beach at Baguran-Jalpai
 Hijili Mangrove Area Picnic Spot
 Rasalpur River
 Nachinda Mandir
 Sand Dunes at Contai
 Neemkuthi of Contai
 Bahiri
 First Telegraph Office, Khejuri
 Bankiput sea beach
 Kadua sea beach
 Daisai
 Soulia beach
 Home of freedom fighter Birendranath Sasmal

References

External links

 Contai Municipality official website 
 Contai Royals-Information about Contai(Developing Now)
 Purba Medinipur District Official Website
 Paschim Medinipur District Official Website
 books on contai by sunil kumar ghosh
 Contai Information Point, Official site of Contai
 SDO Contai
 Prabhat Kumar College, Contai
 Midnapore - Website for East and West Midnapore
 On temples of Midnapur

Cities and towns in Purba Medinipur district
Cities in West Bengal